Compagnie du chemin de fer Lanaudière Inc. (CFL), provides transportation, storage and several unloading sites that accommodate various types of products. The railroad has been in operation since 1992.

Chemin de fer Lanaudière is connected to the Canadian Pacific (CP) and Canadian National (CN) network by the Quebec Gatineau Railway (QGRY). The network includes transhipping sites and offers the possibility of other junctions.

Quebec railways